Pat Sheahan is U Sports Canadian football coach who serves as the offensive line coach for the Guelph Gryphons. He spent 11 years as the head coach of the Concordia Stingers and another 19 years as head coach of the Queen's Gaels. He won three Vanier Cup championships, twice as an assistant coach in 1987 and 2019 and once as head coach in 2009. He was also named Coach of the Year in 2008.

University career
Sheahan played CIAU football as a tight end and offensive tackle for the Concordia Stingers from 1975 to 1979.

Coaching career
Sheahan began his collegiate coaching career as the assistant head coach for the McGill Redmen in 1984 and held that position until 1988, winning a Vanier Cup championship in 1987. He was hired as head coach for the Concordia Stingers in 1989 and led the program to their first Vanier Cup appearance in 1998. He then became head coach for the Queen's Gaels in 2000 and won his first Vanier Cup as a head coach in 2009. He was also named CIS coach of the year in 2008 season. After qualifying for the playoffs in just two out of five years, Sheahan was asked to resign following the 2018.

In 2019, Sheahan was named the offensive coordinator for the Calgary Dinos. In his first year, he won his third championship as the Dinos won the 55th Vanier Cup. The 2020 U Sports football season was cancelled, but Sheahan coached in one more season in 2021. Sheahan announced his retirement on January 24, 2022. However, he later joined the Guelph Gryphons on March 10, 2022, as the team's offensive line coach which also reunited him with his son, Ryan Sheahan, who serves as the team's head coach.

References

External links 
 Calgary Dinos bio

Living people
Sportspeople from Brockville
Players of Canadian football from Ontario
Concordia Stingers football players
Queen's Golden Gaels football coaches
McGill Redbirds football coaches
Concordia Stingers football coaches
Calgary Dinos football coaches
Year of birth missing (living people)